Klara Gabriele Bühl (born 7 December 2000) is a German footballer who plays as a forward or winger for FC Bayern München, and the Germany national team.

Club career
Klara Bühl first played in various youth teams of the Spvgg Untermünstertal before moving to the youth department of the Bundesliga club SC Freiburg in the summer of 2013. From the 2014–15 season on, she competed with the B-Juniors in the Bundesliga South and reached the semi-finals of the German Championship with the 2016 team. There she scored all three goals for Freiburg in the 3–2 victory in the second leg against FSV Gütersloh 2009, but the team missed the final after a 2–0 epss in the first leg. For the 2016–17 season, Bühl moved up early to the women's team of Freiburg and made her debut on 11 September 2016 (2nd matchday) in the 5–0 victory in the home game against MSV Duisburg as a substitute for Lena Petermann in the Bundesliga. After she had been mainly substituted in 2016–17, she regularly played in Freiburg's starting eleven in 2017–18 and scored her first three Bundesliga goals in the 7–0 win in the away game against 1. FC Köln on 1 October 2017 (4th matchday) with the goals for 3–0, 4–0 and 5–0.

It was announced in April 2020 that she would sign for Bayern Munich. The following year, she signed a contract extension that would keep her at the club until 2025. In the 2021–22 season, Bühl was Bayern's joint second-highest goalscorer with 13 goals in all competitions.

International career
Bühl made her debut for the national team on 23 April 2014 as part of the U-15 national team's friendly match against the Dutch team and scored her first three goals on 28 October 2014 in a 13–0 win over Scotland. After four appearances for the U-16 national team, in 2016 she was the youngest player in the German squad for the European Championship, which took place in Belarus from 4 to 16 May 2016. She played in all five matches and won the Under-17 European Championship title after a 3–2 final victory in penalty shootout against the Spanish team. Bühl was also part of the German line-up for the 2016 U-17 World Cup in Jordan and reached the quarter-finals with the team where Spain lost 2–1.

In March 2017, she made her debut for the U-19 national team, with which she qualified for the Under-19 European Championship in Northern Ireland in the same year and reached the semi-finals there against France. Bühl scored 1–0 in this game but the French won 2–1 in the end. The following year Bühl was part of the German line-up for the U-20 World Cup in France and played in all three group games as well as in the quarter-finals, which were lost 3–1 to the future World Champion from Japan.

In December 2018, she was appointed by national coach Martina Voss-Tecklenburg to the senior national squad for the winter training camp in Marbella from 14 to 21 January 2019 for the first time. On 28 February 2019, she was substituted for the senior national team in the 90th minute in a test match against France, thus completing her first game for the senior national team. For the 2019 World Cup, she was called to the German team by Voss-Tecklenburg.

Career statistics

Scores and results list Germany's goal tally first, score column indicates score after each Bühl goal.

Honours
SC Freiburg
 DFB-Pokal: runner-up 2018–19

Bayern Munich
 Bundesliga: 2020–21
Germany
 UEFA Women's Championship runner-up: 2022
Germany U17
 UEFA U-17 Women's Championship: 2016
Individual

 UEFA Women's Championship Team of the Tournament: 2022

References

External links

 Interview mit Klara Bühl, dfb 26 May 2019

2000 births
German women's footballers
Germany women's international footballers
Living people
People from Friedrichshafen
Sportspeople from Tübingen (region)
SC Freiburg (women) players
FC Bayern Munich (women) players
Footballers from Baden-Württemberg
Frauen-Bundesliga players
Women's association football midfielders
2019 FIFA Women's World Cup players
FSV Gütersloh 2009 players
UEFA Women's Euro 2022 players
Association football forwards
Women's association football forwards